Jade Yachts is a Taiwanese yacht manufacturer headquartered in Kaohsiung, Taiwan.

History 

Jade Yachts was founded in 2004 as a subsidiary of Jong Shyn Shipbuilding Company specializing in steel and aluminum yachts. In 2006 the yard delivered the 26.46-metre Bandido, which was the first steel-hulled motor yacht ever built in Taiwan. 

In 2014 the company created a floating pavilion for the Taiwan International Boat Show.

In 2016 the yard gave the 65 m Benetti Ambrosia III its 10-year refit.

Vessels

Amadeus/Felix 
Felix is a 70 m yacht launched in 1969 as a research vessel by Neue Jadewerft and converted into a luxury yacht by Jade Yachts in 2007. She was originally owned by Bernard Arnault.

Jade 959 
Jade 959 is a 52 m ice class yacht launched in 2014.

See also 
 List of companies of Taiwan
 Maritime industries of Taiwan
 Ocean Alexander
 Horizon Yachts 
 Johnson Yachts
 Nordhavn/Ta shing (yacht)

References 

Manufacturing companies based in Kaohsiung
Taiwanese boat builders
Taiwanese brands
Taiwanese companies established in 2004
Vehicle manufacturing companies established in 2004
Yacht building companies